Tropaprionus is a genus of wood midges, insects in the family Cecidomyiidae. There are seven described species in Tropaprionus.

Species
 Tropaprionus aciculatus (Mamaev, 1997)
 Tropaprionus bifurcatus (Mamaev, 1997)
 Tropaprionus ellipticus (Mamaev, 1997)
 Tropaprionus indicus (Jaiswal, 1988)
 Tropaprionus kivachensis (Jaschhof, 2009)
 Tropaprionus lobatus (Mamaev, 1997)
 Tropaprionus plicatus (Fedotova, 2004)

References

Cecidomyiidae genera

Taxa named by Mathias Jaschhof
Taxa named by Catrin Jaschhof
Insects described in 2011